Nitze is a surname. Notable people with the surname include:

Maximilian Nitze (1848–1906), German urologist
Otto Nitze (1924–1988), German musician and composer
Paul Nitze (1907–2004), American statesman